Octavia may refer to:

People
 Octavia the Elder (before 66 – after 29 BC), elder half sister of Octavia the Younger and Augustus/Octavian
 Octavia the Younger (c.66–11 BC), sister of Augustus, younger half sister of Octavia the Elder and fourth wife of Mark Antony.
 Claudia Octavia (AD 39–AD 62), daughter of Claudius and Valeria Messalina and first wife of Nero
 Octahvia (fl. 1980s), American vocalist
 Octavia E. Butler (1947–2006), African-American science fiction writer
 Octavia (early 20th century), the name taken by Mabel Barltrop of the Panacea Society in 1918
 Octavia Spencer (born 1972), actress
 Oktawia Kawęcka (born 1985), jazz musician, singer, flutist, composer, producer and actress

Culture
 Octavia (play), a tragedy mistakenly attributed to the Roman playwright Seneca the Younger that dramatises Claudia Octavia's death
 Octavia (opera), by Reinhard Keiser
 Octavia, a romance by Jilly Cooper
 Octavia (TV serial), an ITV adaptation of Cooper's novel, written by Jonathan Harvey
 Octavia (She-Ra), a character from the cartoon She-Ra: Princess of Power
 Octavia of the Julii, a character in HBO's television series Rome loosely based on Octavia Minor 
 Octavia, Kielian snake in the Guardians of Ga'Hoole series
 Octavia Melody, a background character in the animated show My Little Pony: Friendship Is Magic
 Octavia Blake, a character portrayed in the book series The 100 (novel series) by Kass Morgan
 Octavia Blake, the character in the TV adaptation of Morgan's series, The 100
 Octavia (film), a 1984 American film

Others
 Octavia (gens), a clan which the Roman emperor Augustus, his family and his male-line ancestors originated from
 Škoda Octavia, the name of mid-size family car introduced by the Czech automobile manufacturer Škoda Auto
 Octavia Sperati, a doom metal band
 Octavia Boulevard, a street in San Francisco, California
 Octavia (band), a Bolivian band
 "Octavia", a song by Bruce Dickinson from the album Skunkworks
 598 Octavia, an asteroid
 Octavia (effects pedal), developed originally for Jimi Hendrix
 Octavia, Nebraska, a village in Nebraska, USA
 Octavia, Oklahoma
 Octavia (plant genus), a former plant genus in the family Rubiaceae
 HMS Octavia
 Octavia, a fictional character in the adult animated web-series Helluva Boss